Under an Act passed by the UK Parliament in 1931, there was established an Architects' Registration Council of the United Kingdom (ARCUK), referred to in the Act as "the Council".  The constitution of the Council was prescribed by the First Schedule to the Act.  The Act made the Council a body corporate by the name Architects' Registration Council of the United Kingdom.  It was habitually referred to colloquially by the acronym ARCUK.

When the Warne Report was published in 1993, it was found that its principal recommendation was abolition of this body.  Instead, after a consultation process conducted by the Department of the Environment this body has been reconstituted and renamed as the Architects Registration Board.  It now operates under the Architects Act 1997.

The statutory Register

The originating Act was the Architects (Registration) Act, 1931.  Its long title was "An Act to provide for the Registration of Architects and for purposes connected therewith".  It stated that the Council's duty was to set up and maintain a register, referred to in the Act as "the Register of Architects".  The Act required the Council to cause to be entered in the Register the name and address of every person entitled to be registered under the Act, and annually to publish and offer for sale copies of the Register, setting forth the names of the registered persons in alphabetical order according to their surnames, with their regular business address.

Hard bound copies of all volumes in the annual series so produced, from volume 1 for 1933 and continuing into the years after the name of the registration body was changed to the Architects Registration Board, have been available for inspection by members of the public at the British Architectural Library of the Royal Institute of British Architects, London.

Qualification

For ascertaining whether a person who claimed to be entitled to be registered was duly qualified, the Act required the Council to appoint annually a Board of Architectural Education referred to in the Act as "the Board", and a committee referred to in the Act as "the Admissions Committee".

The constitution of the Board was prescribed by the Second Schedule to the Act.  By the Act two duties were ascribed to the Board, namely, to hold examinations in architecture in accordance with the Act, and to make recommendations to the Council in two respects, namely:
 the recognition of any examinations in architecture the passing of which ought, in the opinion of the Board, to qualify persons for registration under the Act; and
 the holding of any examination in architecture which ought, in the opinion of the Board, to be passed by applicants for registration under the Act.

The constitution of the Admissions Committee was prescribed in the Third Schedule to the Act.  The duty ascribed by the Act to the Admissions Committee was to consider every application for registration under the Act and to report thereon to the Council as to whether the applicant was, in the opinion of the Committee, qualified for registration.

Before a person who had duly applied to the Council could become entitled to be registered, the Act required the Council to be satisfied on a report of the Admission Committee that the applicant was qualified in one of four respects, namely:
 membership of the Royal Academy or of the Royal Scottish Academy; or
 practising as an architect in the United Kingdom at the commencement of the Act; or
 having passed any examination in architecture which was for the time being recognised by the Council; or
 possessing "the prescribed qualifications".
The Council was required to make regulations in respect of anything which by the Act was to be prescribed, but no regulations of the Council were to be of any force or validity without the prior approval of the Privy Council.

Among other things, the 1996 Act abolished the statutory Board of Architectural Education and the Admissions Committee (subsection 118(2)).

Restrictions on use of "architect"

The long title of the originating Act of 1931 was "An Act to provide for the Registration of architects and for purposes connected therewith".  By subsection 3(3) of this Act the register which the Council was required to set up, maintain and publish annually was to be called the Register of Registered Architects; and under section 10 of the originating Act persons who were entitled to apply for registration could thereby claim "to take and use the name of 'Registered Architect'" as a statutory right, with effect from 1932.

By subsection 3(3) of the Architects Registration Act, 1938 the name of this statutory register was changed to the Register of Architects, and this continues under the Architects Act 1997.

The change of name was made in connection with the introduction of statutory restrictions on the use of the vernacular word "architect", which were to apply to all persons, including fully qualified practising members of the Royal Institute of British Architects (RIBA) or other chartered bodies of architects, or societies or associations.  This innovation was imposed under threat of penalty on prosecution in a magistrates' court for infringement.

Professional conduct

The Discipline Committee which was constituted under the 1931 Act was abolished under subsection 118(2) of the 1996 Act.  Instead there is a Professional Conduct Committee which operates under Part III of the 1997 Act.

See also
For sources, references and further information see:

 The Architects (Registration) Acts, 1931 to 1938.
 Extent and citations of the Acts
 Formation and duties of ARCUK
 Architects Act 1997
 Regulations and rules
 Penal restriction
 The Board of Architectural Education
 Nomination and appointment
 Statutory nomenclature
 Reform of Architects Registration, (Warne Report and Consultation)
 Architects Registration in the United Kingdom:
 Use of title
 Background to legislation, cc19-20
 Three aspects
 1931 regime
 From 1990s
 Chronology 1834-1997
 The present legislation
 Summary of legislative history
 The "burdens" and "choices"
 Side-effects
 Membership of the Board
 Duties of the Board
 "Architecture" and "architectural services"
 The Architects Registration Board
 Links to the Architects Act 1997

Registration of architects in the United Kingdom
Architecture organisations based in the United Kingdom
Law of the United Kingdom
Professional certification in architecture